Niccolo da Verona (15th century) was an Italian painter of the Renaissance period. He painted a fresco of the Virgin with the Child and Saints in the Ognissanti at Mantua, is signed with this name, and dated 1461.

References

15th-century Italian painters
Italian male painters
Painters from Verona
Renaissance painters
Year of death unknown
Year of birth unknown